George Creek is a stream in Alberta, Canada. It is a tributary of the Blackstone River.

George Creek has the name of George Buxenstein, a land agent.

See also
List of rivers of Alberta

References

Rivers of Alberta